Szymon Działakiewicz (born 17 February 2000) is a Polish handball player for Gwardia Opole and the Polish national team.

References

2000 births
Living people
People from Legnica
Sportspeople from Lower Silesian Voivodeship
Polish male handball players